Sambro Head is a community of the Halifax Regional Municipality, Nova Scotia located between Ketch Harbour and Sambro  on the Chebucto Peninsula 
on Nova Scotia Route 349.

References
 Explore HRM
 Halifax, geographical codes and localities Stats Canada
Google map of Sambro Head
 Sambro Head

Communities in Halifax, Nova Scotia
General Service Areas in Nova Scotia